XMLSpy is a proprietary XML editor and integrated development environment (IDE) developed by Altova. XMLSpy allows developers to create XML-based and Web services applications using technologies such as XML, JSON, XBRL, XML Schema, XSLT, XPath, XQuery, WSDL and SOAP.

Development
XMLSpy was first released in 1999, producing an integrated development environment for XML. It is a licensed software product that uses key protection to prevent unlicensed usage. Version 3.5 was released in 2000, allowing graphical input for editing diagrams and access to remote files. Version 4.1, released in 2001, added the capability to create XML schemas. The 5.0 version of the program was released in 2002, adding a XSLT processor, XSLT debugger, a WSDL editor, HTML importer, and a Java as well as C++ generator. The version's XML document editor was redesigned to allow for easier use by businesses. XMLSpy 2006 was given the Platinum Award by SQL Pro Magazine'''s Editor's choice awards. XMLSpy 2007 added increased XPath capabilities, including better integration with Microsoft Word.

In 2008 XMLSpy was the gold recipient in the Development Platform category by SQL Server Pro. In 2009 XMLSpy was named the Editors' Best Best Development Tool's Silver Award recipient by Windows IT Pro Magazine''. XMLSpy 2010 added additional support for WSDL 2.0, as well as JSON editing. In 2011 the program added additional charting and graphing support, in addition to enhancing other program capabilities. In 2012 the new version added support for HTML5 and EPUB. The 2013 version then added new XML validation tools. The program also has support for XBRL, in order to manage and view XBRL data. Version 2014 includes support for XQuery Update Facility, with recent updates adding support for JSON Schema and Apache Avro.

Multiple views
Altova XMLSpy includes multiple views and editing features for the following:

XML instance document creation and editing	
JSON and JSON Schema editing & conversion
Visual XML Schema development
DTD editing
XSLT 1.0/2.0 development and debugging
XQuery development and debugging	
XPath 1.0/2.0 development and analysis
Office Open XML development
XBRL taxonomy & instance document creation, editing, and validation
Web services development
Graphical WSDL creation and editing
SOAP development and debugging
Apache Avro visualization and schema editing
Java, C++, C# code generation

See also
 XML Notepad
 Comparison of XML editors

References

External links
 description of Altova XMLSpy (German)

XML editors
JSON
XSLT processors
XQuery processors
XML software
Software that uses Scintilla